Circlotoma is a genus of sea snails, marine gastropod mollusks in the family Tornidae within the superfamily Truncatelloidea.

Species
Species within the genus Circlotoma include:
 Circlotoma bellatula Feng, 1996
 Circlotoma callusa Laseron, 1958
 Circlotoma planorbis Laseron, 1958
 Circlotoma rotata Laseron, 1958
 Circlotoma transculpta Laseron, 1958
 Circlotoma venusta (Hedley, 1901)

References

External links
 To World Register of Marine Species

Tornidae